Blomøyna, or Blomøy, is an island in the municipality of Øygarden in Vestland county, Norway.  The  island is the second largest island in the municipality.  The island lies north of the island of Rongøyna and south of the island of Ona.  The southern part of the island is split into two parts by the Blomvågen fjord which cuts northward for  into the island.  The village of Blomvåg surrounds the inner part of the Blomvågen fjord.  Nearly all of the island's residents live in Blomvåg.  Blomvåg Church is located in the village, serving the whole southern part of the municipality.

See also
List of islands of Norway

References

Islands of Vestland
Øygarden